Tococa is a genus of flowering plants belonging to the family Melastomataceae.

Its native range is America.

List  of species: 
 Tococa aristata Benth. 
 Tococa bolivarensis Gleason

References

Melastomataceae
Melastomataceae genera